The Paleochristian Monastery Church in Nepravishtë, Gjirokastër County, Albania is a Cultural Monument of Albania.

References

Cultural Monuments of Albania
Buildings and structures in Libohovë